Iván Darío Angulo Cortés (born 22 March 1999), known as Iván Angulo, is a Colombian football player who plays as attacking midfielder for American Major League Soccer club Orlando City on loan from Brazilian club Palmeiras.

Career
On 14 January 2019, Angulo was loaned out to Palmeiras for one year with an option to buy at the end of the deal. Angulo was going to start out with playing for the clubs U-20 team. Angulo is drawing eyes of scouts across South America with his pace and skills on the ball.

On 11 August 2021, he joined Portimonense in Portugal on loan.

On 25 July 2022, Angulo joined Major League Soccer club Orlando City on a 12-month loan with an additional six-month extension option.

Honours
Orlando City
U.S. Open Cup: 2022

References

1999 births
People from Tumaco
Living people
Colombian footballers
Colombia under-20 international footballers
Association football midfielders
Envigado F.C. players
Sociedade Esportiva Palmeiras players
Cruzeiro Esporte Clube players
Botafogo de Futebol e Regatas players
Portimonense S.C. players
Orlando City SC players
Orlando City B players
Categoría Primera A players
Campeonato Brasileiro Série A players
Primeira Liga players
Major League Soccer players
MLS Next Pro players
Colombian expatriate footballers
Expatriate footballers in Brazil
Colombian expatriate sportspeople in Brazil
Expatriate footballers in Portugal
Colombian expatriate sportspeople in Portugal
Sportspeople from Nariño Department